The Declaration on the Name and Status of the Croatian Literary Language is the statement adopted by Croatian scholars in 1967 arguing for the equal treatment of the Serbian, Croatian, Slovene, and Macedonian language standards in Yugoslavia. Its demands were granted by the 1974 Yugoslav Constitution.

Content
The declaration was published on March 13, 1967 in the Telegram, Yugoslav newspapers for social and cultural issues, nr. 359, March 17, 1967.

The Declaration affirms that Serbian and Croatian are linguistically the same, but demands separate language standards, each with their own "national" language name.

This document addressed the Sabor of SR Croatia and the Assembly of SFR Yugoslavia, stating:

The signers of the declaration demanded the equality of the four Yugoslav language standards and the use of the Croatian literary language in schools and media. State authorities were accused of imposing an official state language.

Legacy 

The demands were rejected, and the Croatian Spring (MASPOK) movement was stopped. However, the Declaration was taken into consideration in the new Yugoslav constitution of 1974. Nearly all requests were granted in the formulation, and it remained in effect until the breakup of Yugoslavia.

The Declaration prompted Pavle Ivić to respond with his 1971 monograph Srpski narod i njegov jezik ("The Serbian People and Their Language").

In 2012, Josip Manolić publicly claimed that that long-standing State Security agent 'Forum' contributed to the writing of the Declaration, which journalists attributed to Dalibor Brozović. The same year, a 1997 manuscript by a Zadar university professor Ante Franić was published that had implicated Brozović, at the time one of his colleagues, in a similar manner.

On the publication's 45th anniversary in 2012, the Croatian weekly journal Forum republished the Declaration, accompanied by a critical analysis. On the occasion of the 50th anniversary, a new Declaration on the Common Language of the Croats, Montenegrins, Serbs and Bosniaks was written in 2017 in Zagreb.

Signatories 

 Matica hrvatska
 Croatian Writers' Association
 Croatian PEN
 Various departments of JAZU and the Faculty of Philosophy in Zagreb and in Zadar
 Old Church Slavonic Institute
 The association of the literary translators of Croatia (Društvo književnih prevodilaca Hrvatske)

See also 
Croatian Spring
SR Croatia
Croatian language
Croato-Serbian language
Days of the Croatian Language
Comparison of standard Bosnian, Croatian, Montenegrin and Serbian
Declaration on the Common Language 2017

References

External links
 
 Original text, Deklaracija o nazivu i položaju hrvatskog književnog jezika published in Telegram, "Yugoslav newspapers for social and cultural questions, nr. 359, 17 March 1967

Serbo-Croatian language
Croatian language
1967 in Croatia
1967 documents
Linguistics
Linguistic controversies
Language policy in Bosnia and Herzegovina, Croatia, Montenegro and Serbia